Keff may refer to:
an abbreviation for the reactivity coefficient k-effective (written as keff), the effective neutron multiplication factor within an assembly of fissile material, in nuclear reactor theory
Kerala Farmers Federation, an Indian organisation
Keff McCulloch, a British composer
Keff Ratcliffe, a Welsh  musician and the former guitarist for the American band  LA Guns.